Jacob Rehm (December 7, 1828–April 6, 1915) was a policeman who served several tenures as the head of the Chicago Police Department.

He was also involved in crime schemes, being sentenced to six months of prison in 1876 for his role in Chicago's segment of the Whiskey Ring.

Rehm later was involved in building and operating streetcars on the city's North Side.

Early life
Rehm was born December 7, 1828, in Gerstheim, located in the Alsace region of France.

In 1840, at the age of twelve, he immigrated with his parents to Chicago.

Career
In 1855, Rehm was appointed Chicago's street commissioner.

Rehm was appointed the Chicago Police Department's first deputy superintendent in 1855. He also became the Police Captain of the North Side.

In 1857, Rehm briefly served as First Lieutenant.

In 1858, he became the City Hall Police Captain.

From March 1, 1859, through March 5, 1860, Rehm served as City Marshall, the head of the Chicago Police Department.
 
After resigning from the police force in 1860, he worked with a brewery.

On March 27, 1861, Rehm was appointed by the newly-established police board as Deputy Superintendent of Police. This came after the department had ended the position of City Marshall, but before they had yet to appoint a General Superintendent of Police to be the new head of police. This put Rehm as a de facto head of the police force. On April 6, the board appointed Cyrus P. Bradley to assist Rehm in supervising the police force. They, effectively, jointly headed the police force until April 23, when the board appointed Bradley the General Superintendent of Police.

Rehm worked with Bradley to create a more effective police force, aiming to create a professional force with a standardized image. Together, they introduced physical requirements for all men hired for the force. They also reintroduced police uniforms, creating uniforms copied after those of the New York City Metropolitan Police. They put into place rules about what facial hair policemen would be permitted to sport. Rehm and Bradley also acquired reputations for severely disciplining their men.

Rehm succeeded Bradley as the General Superintendent of Police, serving from February 20, 1863, until July 3, 1863.

After this, he became involved with a brewery again. In 1865, he founded a brewery baring his name.

After William Turtle resigned in November 1865, Rehm was appointed General Superintendent of Police again. He served until 1871. He was serving on an interim basis from November 1865 until January 13, 1866, when he was appointed permanent General Superintendent of Police.  During this 1865–1871 tenure, in 1867, a major labor strike occurred in Chicago over demands for an eight-hour day, and Rehm was tasked with keeping the peace.

On February 8,  1869, he was also appointed to serve a five-year term as an inaugural commissioner of Lincoln Park.

Beginning in 1871, Rehm served on the Chicago Police Board, retiring from it in May of the following year. He was replaced on the board by Ernest Klokke. 

In the 1871 municipal elections, he was involved with the "Fireproof" ticket, which elected Joseph Medill in the mayoral race.

In 1872, Rehm, then a sergeant, was forced to resign from the police force after improperly releasing a prisoner. He later rejoined as a sergeant, but was fired in 1873 for obeying the police commissioners over embattled General Superintendent Elmer Washburn.

For the 1873 election cycle, Rehm was politically involved with the People's Party. The party's mayoral candidate that year, Harvey D. Colvin, was successful. 

At the request of Michael C. McDonald, a crime boss influential in Chicago politics who was friendly with Rehm, newly-elected mayor Colvin appointed Rehm to again as General Superintendent of Police. Rehm was appointed after Elmer Washburn resigned. During this tenure, in exchange for $30,000, Rehm provided McDonald access to confidential police records.

McDonald and Rehm also collaborated as part of the Whiskey Ring, in which they would siphon federal tax dollars from alcohol tax and would funnel the money into Rehm's personal bank accounts, as well as bank accounts of Anton C. Hesing and other political allies of McDonald.

Rehm resigned as General Superintendent of Police on October 4, 1875. He resigned in scandal.

Rehm served six months of prison time and paid a $10,000 fine for his role in the Whiskey Ring. His sentencing came on July 7, 1876.

Rehm was involved with the construction of the North Side streetcars. Among the streetcar companies he was invested in were the North Chicago City Railway and the North Division Railway Company. He was also involved in the leadership of such companies.

In 1891, Rehm built an August Fiedler-designed mansion in Chicago's Gold Coast neighborhood.

Later life
Rehm died March 6, 1915, of paralysis.

See also
Political corruption in Illinois

References

General Superintendents of the Chicago Police Department
1828 births
1915 deaths
People from Bas-Rhin
French emigrants to the United States
Illinois politicians convicted of crimes